Kadapa–Bangalore section is an ongoing broad-gauge railway line project in the Indian states of Andhra Pradesh and Karnataka. It connects Kadapa in Andhra Pradesh with Bangalore in Karnataka via Kolar.

History 
The foundation stone for this project was laid on 2 September 2010 with an outlay of 2000cr's.

Construction 
This project will be constructed in four stages namely . Stage 1 will connect Rayachoti and stage 2 with Dharmavaram–Pakala branch line at Madanapalle and stage 3 will connect Madanapalle to Mulbagal and stage 4 last will connect Mulbagal to Kolar and last via Bangarapet to reach Bangalore.

Jurisdiction 

This project falls under the jurisdiction of both Guntakal railway division of South Central Railway zone and Bangalore railway division of South Western Railway zone. Out of 260.40 km, 217.60 km falls under Guntakal railway division and rest of the route km falls under the jurisdiction of Bangalore railway division.

Status
This railway line is operational up to Pendlimarri and regular train service started from June 16, 2017. Rs.210 crores were allotted in 2019 for this railway line.

References 

Proposed railway lines in India
Bangalore railway division
Guntakal railway division
Transport in Bangalore
5 ft 6 in gauge railways in India